Lee Altus is a Ukrainian-American heavy metal guitarist currently playing in Exodus and Heathen.

Career 
Altus first came to public attention in the mid-1980s with his original band, Heathen. He served as the principal songwriter and a founding member of Heathen playing on all four of their LPs, Breaking the Silence, Victims of Deception, The Evolution of Chaos and Empire of the Blind. In 1990, Altus was considered for the position in Megadeth vacated by Jeff Young, but declined, and the job was given instead to Marty Friedman. He later became a permanent member of the band Exodus.

After Heathen broke up in 1992, Altus moved to Germany along with his fellow ex-Heathen members Doug Piercy and Darren Minter. Altus and Minter played in the industrial metal group Die Krupps for much of the remainder of the 1990s. He also participated in a reunited version of Angel Witch.

In 2001, Altus reunited Heathen along with Minter, vocalist Dave White, bassist Mike Jastremski and guitarist Ira Black. The band put out an EP entitled Recovered,  made up of rare material and, with a new second guitarist and bassist, in 2010 released The Evolution of Chaos, followed a decade later by Empire of the Blind (2020). Altus has been a member of the San Francisco thrash metal band Exodus since 2005, replacing longtime guitarist Rick Hunolt. To date, Altus has performed on six studio albums with Exodus: Shovel Headed Kill Machine (2005), The Atrocity Exhibition (2007), Let There Be Blood (2008), Exhibit B: The Human Condition (2010), Blood In, Blood Out (2014) and Persona Non Grata (2021).

Personal life 
Lee is a longtime fan of the Philadelphia Flyers NHL franchise, including wearing Flyers shirts while headlining the 2020 70,000 Tons of Metal festival.

Equipment 
Altus currently endorses ESP Guitars, though he used to play Jackson King V guitars. Altus was a long time user of Mesa/Boogie Amplifiers as well, but is currently an ENGL endorsee.

References

External links 

Interview with Lee Altus and his mother from CBS News, 1987

1966 births
20th-century American guitarists
21st-century American guitarists
American heavy metal guitarists
American people of Russian-Jewish descent
Angel Witch members
California Republicans
Die Krupps members
Exodus (American band) members
Heathen (band) members
Jewish heavy metal musicians
Lead guitarists
Living people
Musicians from Odesa
Ukrainian emigrants to the United States